Adam Gazda (born March 20, 1987 in Carnegie, Pennsylvania) is a former American soccer player.

Career

College and amateur
Gazda attended Chartiers Valley High School and played four years of college soccer at Lehigh University.

During his college years Gazda also played three seasons for Reading Rage in the USL Premier Development League. He was named to the PDL All-League team in 2008.

Professional
Gazda turned professional in 2010 when he signed to play for the Pittsburgh Riverhounds in the USL Second Division. He made his professional debut on April 24, 2010 in a game against the Charleston Battery.

References

External links
Lehigh bio

1987 births
Living people
American soccer players
Lehigh Mountain Hawks men's soccer players
Reading United A.C. players
Pittsburgh Riverhounds SC players
USL League Two players
USL Second Division players
USL Championship players
People from Carnegie, Pennsylvania
Association football midfielders
Soccer players from Pennsylvania